The Brit Award for British Producer of the Year is an award given by the British Phonographic Industry (BPI), an organisation which represents record companies and artists in the United Kingdom. The accolade is presented at the Brit Awards, an annual celebration of British and international music. The award was first presented in 1977. It was not presented in 1989, between 1999 and 2008, in 2017 or 2021. As of the 38th Brit Awards in 2018, the winner is selected by a jury and no nominees are announced.

The inaugural recipient of the award is George Martin, best known for his work with The Beatles. To date, Kate Bush in 1990 is the only solo woman to have been nominated for the award, though Heather Small and Alison Goldfrapp were nominated as part of M People and Goldfrapp in 1994 and 2015 respectively. Trevor Horn, David A. Stewart and Paul Epworth hold the record for most wins in this category, with three each. Brian Eno is the only other producer to have won the award more than once, winning in both 1994 and 1996. Dean Cover, professionally known as Inflo, was also the first black person to win the award. In 2023, the award was presented to French DJ David Guetta, who became the first international recipient.

Winners and nominees

Multiple nominations and awards

Notes
 Peter Gabriel (1993) also won Brit Award for British Male Solo Artist 
 The Verve (1998) also won Brit Award for British Group

References

Brit Awards
Awards established in 1977
Awards established in 1982
Awards established in 1990
Awards established in 2009
Awards established in 2018
Awards disestablished in 1977
Awards disestablished in 1988
Awards disestablished in 1998
Awards disestablished in 2016